Sitkinak Island is an island of the Kodiak Archipelago of the state of Alaska, United States. It lies south of the southern tip of Kodiak Island in the western part of the Gulf of Alaska. Tugidak Island lies to its west. The two islands are the largest components of the Trinity Islands of Alaska. The Trinity Islands, and thus Sitkinak, are part of the Gulf of Alaska unit of Alaska Maritime National Wildlife Refuge. Sitkinak Island has a land area of 235.506 km2 (90.929 sq mi) and no resident population.

Cattle Operation

Alaska Meat Company runs a totally free range cattle operation, Sitkinak Ranch. They have about 600 head which are slaughtered and processed on the island in late fall to sell as "Beyond Organic" beef.  The unique herd of cattle have thrived on the eastern and western islands of Sitkinak since 1937.  It is one of the few pristine islands in the world to support this rare species of cattle.  More information can be found at Alaska Meat Company and other websites that chronicle past military activity on Sitkinak.

There is a healthy population of red fox (Vulpes vulpes) on the island. Fox pelages varies widely with many cross individuals and cross variants.

References

Islands of the Kodiak Archipelago
Alaska Maritime National Wildlife Refuge
Protected areas of Kodiak Island Borough, Alaska
Islands of Alaska